Jens Kindervater (born July 13, 1974) is a German electronic dance music DJ and producer. He is particularly known for the "Michael Mind Project", which he founded together with Francois Sanders in 2007 as "Michael Mind" and renamed in 2010.

Life
Jens Kindervater was born July 13, 1974 in Aachen, where he grew up. He attended the Anne Frank High School in Aachen, graduating in 1994. He then began studying mechanical engineering, but broke it off due to his love of music.

With his later studio partner Bernd Johnen, he established contacts with Alphabet City Musikproduktions- und Verlags GmbH in Mönchengladbach and released his first recordings after one year.

In the mid-1990s, Kindervater moved to Belgium, where he was active in trance and techno music. There he played in many well-known clubs and participated in numerous competitions. He later decided to start a career as a solo artist and was accepted by the German record label Kontor Records. He has been living in Aachen again since 2014.

Music career – solo and various projects
Despite influences from house music and dance-pop, Kindervater is still active in the area of hands-up and techno music. He is the founder and owner of the record labels Kick Fresh Recordings and Yawa Recordings, the latter in which he released his solo singles.

As a solo artist, he originally released his singles under the pseudonyms "Big Bass Inc." and "DJ Jens". Later, he is only active as "Kindervater". New solo singles with artists like Mandy Ventrice or J-Son were released. He is also a popular songwriter, composer, producer and remixer. He writes for DJ Antoine, Carlprit and Cascada among others. He also often represents the Michael Mind Project alone in live performances.

Kindervater has been working with DJ and producer Bernd Johnen for many years. Together they started with different music projects that vary in different genres. Some of them are still active today. However, he now mainly focuses on the Michael Mind Project together with Frank Bülles.

He is also a member of several music projects alongside the Michael Mind Project. With several chart successes, the "4 Clubbers", "Dance United" and "The Real Booty Babes" are his most successful projects. He left the "Dance United", which consists of several German DJs and donates the proceeds to charity. He is or was a member of the following projects and music groups:

Success with Francois Sanders

2007: Foundation of Michael Mind 
Together with DJ and producer Francois Sanders, he founded the project Michael Mind in 2007.

They started their careers by covering the Manfred Mann's Earth Band classic Blinded by the Light in a dance version. Due to the success of the Disco Boys with another hit by the Manfred Mann's Earth Band, "For You", the idea was not implemented. But after the positive response from the producer team "Sunloverz" (Frank Bülles and Bernd Johnen) the track was finally produced. Blinded by the Light was able to maintain number 1 on the dance charts for several weeks and also reached the top 20 of the German single charts and number 51 in Austria.

Shortly afterwards, in October they released their debut album. It bears the title My Mind and contains a few original compositions and cover versions in addition to all previously released titles, but the album was unable to achieve chart placement and was, therefore, less popular.

On August 28, 2009, the last single was released as "Michael Mind", "Gotta Let You Go". This title is again a cover version. The original comes from Dominica and was first released in 1994. This song could only be placed in the German charts. The rapper Old Silverback took part in this song, and he still takes over the rap parts of many of the songs.

2010: Renaming to Michael Mind Project 
For the release of the single "How Does It Feel" in 2009, "Michael Mind" was renamed to "Michael Mind Project". With the addition "Project" the fantasy name should be emphasized, because due to the similarity of a solo project pseudonym and the few appearances of Frank Bülles, on CD covers and appearances, it was assumed that Michael Mind is a solo project. Since then, they have been publishing under this pseudonym. "How Does It Feel" was released on November 27, 2009 and was the first harbinger of the 2013 album State of Mind. The single initially stayed in the German single charts for three weeks, but rose again in 2010. Its top position was rank 67. The next single "Feel Your Body" was also a hit.

With "Feeling So Blue", the duo celebrated their first chart success in Switzerland, as well as with their next success single "". Both tracks and the album track "Last Night"' were recorded in collaboration with the American singer Dante Thomas. Another big leap in the duo's career was working with world stars like Sean Kingston or Jason Derulo.

The duo's first joint album State of Mind was released on January 4, 2013. In contrast to My Mind, this studio album was a great success. The album rose to the top 100 in Germany and Austria just a week after its release. It contains many 2013 versions of old hits from the Michael Mind period and many original compositions.

The duo's latest Michael Mind Project track is the title "One More Round", which was released on June 28, 2013. It was recorded in collaboration with rapper TomE, best known for DJ Antoine's single "Bella Vita", and Canadian singer Raghav, who is known for singles like "So Confused" or "Angel Eyes". It will be the first single that is not on the State of Mind album.

Discography

Compilation albums

EP's

Singles

Remixes (selection)

References

External links 
 Official website
 Jens Kindervater on Myspace

German DJs
1974 births
Living people
Electronic dance music DJs